Andriy Romanovych Khomyn (24 May 1968 – 29 September 1999) was a Ukrainian professional footballer. He made his professional debut in the Soviet Second League in 1988 for FC Prykarpattya Ivano-Frankivsk.

References

1968 births
1999 deaths
Soviet footballers
Ukrainian footballers
Ukraine international footballers
Ukrainian expatriate footballers
Turkmenistan footballers
Turkmenistan international footballers
Turkmenistan expatriate footballers
Dual internationalists (football)
Road incident deaths in Ukraine
FC Spartak Ivano-Frankivsk players
FC Dynamo Kyiv players
FC Vorskla Poltava players
Ukrainian Premier League players
Expatriate footballers in Ukraine
Turkmenistan expatriate sportspeople in Ukraine
Turkmenistan people of Ukrainian descent
Association football defenders
Footballers at the 1998 Asian Games
Asian Games competitors for Turkmenistan
Sportspeople from Ivano-Frankivsk